The Odenville Limestone is a geologic formation in Alabama. It preserves fossils dating from the early Ordovician Period.

As first described by geologist Charles Butts in a 1926 report on Alabama’s geology, the Odenville consisted of “impure argillaceous and siliceous dark fine-grained cherty limestone,” about fifty feet in thickness.

Butts’ original type exposure could not be located by subsequent mappers, so the Odenville nomenclature was dropped and the formation was considered a locally-occurring facies of the underlying Newala Limestone.

Keith Roberson in 1988, and Ed Osborne in 1992, demonstrated the Odenville is indeed a distinctive, mappable lithologic unit, and the term was restored to the Ordovician nomenclature used by the Geological Survey of Alabama in the Appalachian fold-and-thrust belt.

As defined today, the Odenville Limestone is described as a dark gray, primarily dolomitic, stylonodular limestone whose fossil assemblage includes brachiopods and sponges. It is the uppermost member of the Knox Group, a related suite of carbonate rocks deposited at the end of the Cambrian and beginning of the Ordovician.

See also

 List of fossiliferous stratigraphic units in Alabama
 Paleontology in Alabama

References

Ordovician Alabama
Ordovician southern paleotemperate deposits